Two Faces West is an American syndicated TV series set in the Wild West running from October 1960 to July 1961 for a total of 39 half-hour episodes (one per week on a continuous run). It was produced by Donald Gold and Jonas Seinfeld and Matthew Rapf as the on-set producer for Screen Gems. Music was by Joseph Weiss. Despite being syndicated to 150 broadcast stations the show is somewhat forgotten, never having been repeated, and never released on DVD.

The overall premise was that two identical male twins, the January brothers, were in different roles in the same locale: one a doctor and one a U.S. Marshal - one killing, one curing. Between the two they bring civility to a pioneer town in the mid west. Ben is clad in black like an archetypal badman. Typical plots involved them being mistaken for one another or deliberately swapping. Both men were in love with Julie Greer, owner of the town's hotel.

The title is a play on the wording of the 1940 John Wayne film Three Faces West.

The stories are set in the town of Gunnison, Colorado in the 1860s. The series was the first to use split-screen on a perpetual basis in order to get the brothers to talk face to face. In less technical shots, where one brother had his back to the camera, these were shot with stand-in Paul Pepper (who also appeared in his own right as Billy).

Curiously the appearance of Deforest Kelley and Leonard Nimoy predated their casting together in Star Trek by 5 years.

Cast
Charles Bateman as both Dr Rick January and Marshal Ben January
Francis De Sales as Sheriff Maddox
Joyce Meadows as Stacy
Paul Comi as Deputy Johnny Evans
June Blair as Julie Greer, owner of the hotel
Paul Barselou as Amos
Paul Pepper as Billy (and rear shots of the January brothers)
Don Spruance as J. C. Wilkes
Robert Anderson as Amos 
Richard Reeves as Charlie Steams

Guest Stars
DeForest Kelley as Vern Cleary
Leonard Nimoy
Gregg Palmer as
L. Q. Jones
Rex Holman
Victor French
Robert Burton
Willard Sage as the Governor
Chris Alcaide as Corey Willis
Kay E. Kuter as Sheb
Dabbs Greer as Willie Medford
Paul Birch as Josh Wilkes
Julian Burton as Zack
Howard Caine as Jethro
Ron Hagerthy as Lucas Garrett
Denver Pyle as Sam
Robert Stevenson as Fincher
Robert Brubaker as Cartwright
Walter Burke as Prof Gluyas Hatwell
Don C. Harvey as Smith
Marianna Hill as the gypsy
David Manley as Piper
John Marley as Josiah Brady
Jay Strong as Jolie Wilkes
Garry Walberg as Connelly
Donnelly Rhodes as Starbook
Baynes Barron as Reynolds
Jeanne Bates as Elie Bishop
Lou Krugman as Dave Brandon
Robert Myers as Morgan
Grace Raynor as Linda
Dick Rich as Sheriff Russ Kane
Thayer Roberts as Leopold
Jody Warner as Ellen
Guy De Vestel as Frenchy
Maggie McCarter as Emma
Val Benedict as Delalane
Joan Grenville as Della Lyle
Michael Levin as Mario
Barry McGuire as Al
Arvid Nelson as Oliver
Stuart Randall as Evans
Hal Smith as Charlie Todd
Johnny Walsh as Lee
Glenn Stensel as Pete
Pamela Duncan as Liza
Stuart Nisbet as the bartender
Ralph Reed as Teddy
Marya Stevens as Sally
Tex Terry as stagecoach driver
Robert B. Williams as Will Turner
Thom Carney as Baker
Henry Gillen as Will
Raymond Guth as Paul Bishop
Dwight Marfield as Ed
Michael Sargent as johnson
Martin Smith as a thug
John Cason as Wilkes' man
Thano Rama as Porro
Roy Jenson as Wilkes' man
Kenneth Becker as Fred
Henry Beckman as Duvall
Kathie Browne as Laurie Parker
James T. Callahan as Cleve
Dyan Cannon as a lady in town
Walter Coy as Cauter
Warren J. Kemmering as George
Charles Maxwell as Frank Turner
Ken Mayer as Earl
John Milford as Will
Robert Patten as Jim Evans
John Pickard as Laird Willoughby
Michael Stefani as Tom
Barbara Stuart as Millie Adams
Hal Torey as Finch
Robert Beecher as Judas Tripe
Dehl Berti
George Brenlin
Roxane Brooks
Lew Brown as Bray
William Bryant as Corey
William Challee as Caleb
John Cliff
Dennis Cross
Jody Fair as Sarah
James Garde as Augie
Kelton Garwood as Ridge
Pamela Grey as Mary
James Griffith as Les Hardy
Ron Hayes as Toley
Darlene Hendricks as Sarah
Lisabeth Hush as Florie
Chubby Johnson as Riley
Bernard Kates as Chet
Walter Kray as Cole Burnet
Jon Lormer
Ric Marlow
Jack Mather as Caldwell
John McLiam
Don Megowan
George Mitchell as Dan Borden
Laurie Mitchell as Myrna
James Noah as Joel
Ryan O'Neal
Gregg Palmer as Cowlin
Mike Ragan as Charlie Baker
Gilman Rankin as Ned
Chris Robinson as Gordie
Joseph Ruskin as Coley
Jackie Russell as Karen
Johnny Seven as Gino Carew
Richard Shannon as Buchanan
Justin Smith as Varney
Ron Soble as Collins
Irene Tedrow as Lilly
Joe Turkel as Turner
Warren Vanders as Tom Borden
Wally West as a townsman (uncredited)
Herman Hack as a townsman (uncredited)

References

External links
 

1960 American television series debuts
1961 American television series endings
English-language television shows
Television shows set in Colorado
1960s Western (genre) television series
Television series set in the 1860s